James Ballantine (January 27, 1855 Andes, Delaware County, New York – May 4, 1896 Andes, Delaware Co., NY) was an American politician from New York.

Life
He was a merchant, dealing in butter and general merchandise.

He was a trustee of the Village of Andes in 1876 and 1877; Supervisor of the Town of Andes from 1881 to 1889; a member of the New York State Assembly (Delaware Co.) in 1890; and a member of the New York State Senate (26th D.) in 1896.

He died a few days after the end of the session, on May 4, 1896, at his home in Andes, after he "was seized with a paralytic fit", and was buried at the Andes Rural Cemetery.

Sources
 The New York Red Book compiled by Edgar L. Murlin (published by James B. Lyon, Albany NY, 1897; pg. 507)
 SENATOR JAMES BALLANTINE DEAD in NYT on May 5, 1896
 Andes Rural Cemetery transcriptions

1855 births
1896 deaths
Republican Party New York (state) state senators
People from Andes, New York
Republican Party members of the New York State Assembly
Town supervisors in New York (state)
19th-century American politicians